Qaleh-ye Payan (also Romanized as Qal‘eh-ye Pāyān) is a village in Kolbad-e Gharbi Rural District, Kolbad District, Galugah County, Mazandaran Province, Iran. At the 2006 census, its population was 1,243, in 321 families.

References 

Populated places in Galugah County